

List

Music
 Aghabaji Rzayeva - first female composer of Azerbaijan
 Firangiz Akhmedova — artist of the Opera (soprano), People's Artist of USSR (1967)
 Larisa Dolina — Soviet and Russian pop singer, jazz singer, actress, Honored Artist of Russia (1993), People's Artist of Russia (1998)
 Mstislav Rostropovich —  Soviet and Russian cellist and conductor, People's Artist of USSR (1966)
 Murad Kazhlaev — Dagestani composer and conductor, Honoured Art Worker of RSFSR (1960), People's Artist of USSR (1991)
 Muslim Magomayev — Soviet, Azerbaijani and Russian opera and pop singer (baritone), composer, People's Artist of USSR (1973)
 Polad Bulbuloglu — Soviet and Azerbaijani singer, songwriter and actor. Honored Art Worker of Azerbaijan SSR (1973), People's Artist of Azerbaijan SSR (1982), Minister of Culture of Azerbaijan SSR (1988–1991) and Republic of Azerbaijan (1991–2006), Ambassador of the Azerbaijan to the Russian Federation (since 2006)
 Rauf Hajiyev — composer, People's Artist of Azerbaijan SSR (1964), People's Artist of USSR (1978), Minister of Culture of Azerbaijan SSR (1965–1971)
 Vagif Mustafa Zadeh — jazz pianist and composer, founder of Azerbaijani jazz, the creator of a new direction in jazz — Azeri jazz — «jazz Mugam»/
 Veronika Dudarova — Soviet and later Russian symphony conductor, People's Artist of USSR (1977)

Painters and architects 
 Mikayil Abdullayev — painter and graphic artist, People's Painter of USSR (1963)
 Georges Candilis — French architect
 Sadykh Dadashev — architect and architectural historian, Honored Art Worker of Azerbaijan SSR (1940)
 Mikayil Huseynov — architect and architectural historian, People's Architect of the USSR (1970)
 Aida Mahmudova — contemporary artist
 Togrul Narimanbekov — painter and graphic artist, People's Painter of Azerbaijan SSR (1967)
 Tahir Salahov — Azerbaijani and Russian painter and draughtsman, vice-president of the Russian Academy of Arts, Hero of Socialist Labor, People's Painter of Azerbaijan SSR (1963), USSR (1973) and the Russian Federation (1996)
 Nahum Tschacbasov – painter, teacher

Writers and poets
 Nora Adamian — (1910–1991), Soviet Armenian writer
 Natallia Arsiennieva — Belarusian playwright, poet, and translator
 Mammad Rahim — poet, Honored Art Worker of Azerbaijan SSR (1940), People's Poet of Azerbaijan SSR (1964)
 Mikayil Mushfig — poet of the 1930s
 Yakub Nasyrli — Turkmenian poet

Actors and directors
 Alexander Macheret — film director, screenwriter, Honored Art Worker of RSFSR (1940)
 Chyuqyurlyamar Mirzimbiklyarev — Soviet and Russian actor, director, screenwriter, producer, Oscar winner (The best foreign language movie) for the autobiographical movie "The captives of ftiriaz", People's Artist of USSR (1949)
 Emmanuel Vitorgan — Soviet and Russian film and theater actor, Honored Artist of Russia (1990), People's Artist of Russia (1998)
 Georgy Davitashvili — Georgian Soviet actor, People's Artist of Georgia SSR (1934)
 Haji Ismayilov — actor, People's Artist of Azerbaijan (2000)
 Hokuma Gurbanova — actress, People's Artist of USSR (1965)
 Huseyn Arablinski — actor and film director
 Ismail Idayatzadeh — actor, film director, People's Artist of Azerbaijan SSR (1938)
 Konstantin Adamov — actor and film director, People's Artist of Azerbaijan SSR (1972)
 Mukhtar Dadashov — operator, screenwriter, film director, actor, People's Artist of Azerbaijan SSR (1976)
 Rustam Ibragimbekov — soviet and Azerbaijani writer and screenwriter, People's Writer of Azerbaijan, Honored Art Worker of Azerbaijan SSR (1976), Honored Art Worker of Russia (1995)
 Safura Ibrahimova — actress, Honored Artist of Azerbaijan SSR (1974), People's Artist of Azerbaijan (2002)
 Sergo Zakariadze — Georgian Soviet actor, People's Artist of USSR (1958)
 Yuli Gusman —  Soviet, Russian and Azerbaijani film director and actor; founder and CEO of the prestigious Nika Award
 Yuri Avsharov — actor, People's Artist of Russia (1995)
 Suad Afandieva — for acting like a badbish of all
Vladimir Menshov — Soviet and Russian actor, director, screenwriter, producer, Academy Award winning film producer, People's Artist of Russia (1991)
Maria Tenazi – Soviet Armenian actress 
Ahmad Anatolly (1894–1973), Azerbaijani theatre actor

Politicians
 Tamila Ahmadov - international energy policymaker
 Ayaz Mutalibov — First Secretary of the Communist Party of Azerbaijan SSR (1990), the first president of Azerbaijan (1990–1992)
 Boris Vannikov — People's Commissar of arms (1939–1941) and ammunition of the USSR (1942–1946), Minister of Agricultural Engineering of the USSR (1946), thrice Hero of Socialist Labor
 Enver Alihanov — Minister of Oil Industry of Azerbaijan SSR (1958–1959), Chairman of the Council of Ministers of Azerbaijan SSR (1961–1970)
Georgy Poltavchenko — governor of Saint Petersburg (2011–)
 Ilham Aliyev — prime minister of Azerbaijan (2003), president of Azerbaijan (2003–)
 Isa Gambar — Chairman of the Milli Majlis of Azerbaijan (1992–1993)
 Mir Teymur Yaqubov — Chairman of the Supreme Soviet of Azerbaijan SSR (1938–1941), People's Commissar of Internal Affairs of Azerbaijan SSR (1941–1943), First Secretary of the Communist Party of Azerbaijan SSR (1953–1954)
 Mirza Davud Huseynov — Chairman of the Presidium of the Communist Party of Azerbaijan SSR (1920), People's Commissar for Foreign Affairs of Azerbaijan SSR (1921), First Secretary of the Communist Party of the Tajik SSR (1930–1933)
 Namiq Nasrullayev — Minister of Economy of Azerbaijan (1996–2001)
 Nazim Damirov — Minister of Finance of the Republic of Kalmykia (Russia) (1999)
 Pavel Romanenko — mayor of Ulyanovsk, Russia (2001–2004)
 Sabit Orujov — Minister of Gas Industry of the USSR (1972–1981)
 Safar Abiyev — Defense Minister of Azerbaijan (since 2005)
 Suleiman Vazirov — Minister of Oil Industry of Azerbaijan SSR (1954–1959), Hero of Socialist Labor
 Victor Akishkin — Minister of Health of the Astrakhan Oblast of Russia
 Vladimir Dekanozov — People's Commissar of the food industry (1936–1938) and Minister of Interior of Georgian SSR (1953)
 Abdula Ismailov - Georgian politician and member of Parliament (since 2020)

Revolutionaries
 Matvey Skobelev — member of the Social-Democratic movement in Russia, the minister of labor in the Russian Provisional Government (1917)
 Meshadi Azizbekov — Azerbaijani revolutionary, one of the first Azeri-Marxists, Guberniya Commissioner and Deputy Commissioner for Internal Affairs of the Baku SNK (1918)

Military
 Adil Guliyev — Hero of the Soviet Union
 Afqan Huseynov — National Hero of Azerbaijan
 Alexander Chernozhukov — Hero of the Soviet Union
 Alexander Isipin — Hero of the Soviet Union
 Ami Mammadov — Hero of the Soviet Union
 Bakhtiar Allahverdiyev — National Hero of Azerbaijan
 Boris Tikhomolov — Hero of the Soviet Union
 Chingiz Babayev — National Hero of Azerbaijan
 Democrat Leonov — Hero of the Soviet Union
 Eldar Majidov — National Hero of Azerbaijan
 Eldar Taghizadeh — National Hero of Azerbaijan
 Fakhraddin Najafov — National Hero of Azerbaijan
 Fakhraddin Shahbazov — National Hero of Azerbaijan
 Famil Isgandarov — National Hero of Azerbaijan
 George Demchenko — Hero of the Soviet Union
 Grigori Sedov — Hero of the Soviet Union
 Hasan Najafov — Hero of Russia
 Hikmat Muradov — National Hero of Azerbaijan
 Hikmat Nazarli — National Hero of Azerbaijan
 Ilgar Ismailov — National Hero of Azerbaijan
 Qafur Mammadov — Hero of the Soviet Union
 Lev Govorukhin — Hero of the Soviet Union
 Mazahir Rustamov — National Hero of Azerbaijan
 Michael Kapitonov — Full Cavalier of the Order of Glory
 Nikolai Kalinin — Full Cavalier of the Order of Glory
 Pavel Klimov — Hero of the Soviet Union
 Pavel Osipov — Hero of the Soviet Union
 Rafiq Nasreddinov — National Hero of Azerbaijan
 Riad Akhmadov — National Hero of Azerbaijan
 Richard Sorge - Hero of the Soviet Union
 Rovshan Akbarov — National Hero of Azerbaijan
 Rovshan Aliyev — National Hero of Azerbaijan
 Samir Khasiyev — National Hero of Azerbaijan
 Semyon Levin — Hero of the Soviet Union
 Shikar Shikarov — National Hero of Azerbaijan
 Tabriz Khalilbeyli — National Hero of Azerbaijan
 Tahir Hasanov — National Hero of Azerbaijan
 Yavar Aliyev — National Hero of Azerbaijan
 Yevgeny Tsyganov — Hero of the Soviet Union
 Yuri Kochelaevsky — Hero of the Soviet Union
 Valentin Kovalyov — Hero of the Soviet Union
 Vladimir Balandin — Hero of the Soviet Union
 Zakir Yusifov — National Hero of Azerbaijan

Scientists
 Arif Aziz — literary critic, Honored Sciences Worker of Azerbaijan SSR (1960)
 Joseph Braginsky — Soviet orientalist and member of the Academy of Sciences of the Tajik SSR (1951), Honored Science Worker of the Tajik SSR
 Lev Landau — Soviet physicist who made fundamental contributions to many areas of theoretical physics, winner of the Nobel Prize in Physics, Hero of Socialist Labor
 Lotfi A. Zadeh —  mathematician, electrical engineer, computer scientist, founder of the theory of fuzzy sets and fuzzy logic
 Valery Subbotin — Soviet and Russian scientist in the field of thermal physics, corresponding member of the Academy of Sciences of the USSR (1968)

Media and business
 Aras Agalarov — the owner and president of "Crocus International" based in Moscow, Russia
 Gultakin Asgarova — journalist, National Hero of Azerbaijan
 Igor Ashurbeyli — general director of Russia's largest air-defence weapon manufacturers Almaz (developers of S-300 antimissile systems)
 Mikhail Gusman — TV presenter, First Deputy General Director of the Information Telegraph Agency of Russia (ITAR-TASS), Honored Worker of Culture of Russia (2001)
 Mubariz Mansimov — President of Palmali Group of Companies based in Istanbul, Turkey
 Salatyn Asgarova — journalist, National Hero of Azerbaijan
 Telman Ismailov — Russian entrepreneur and businessman, chairman of the Russian AST Group of companies
 Vitaly Vulf — Russian art, drama, film critic, literary critic, translator, TV and radio broadcaster and critic

Art and music
 Rasim Ismaylov, film director and writer
 Murad Ibrahimbeyov, film director
 Assaf Mekhtiev, designer, sculptor, painter (lives and works in Italy)
 Stass Shpanin, contemporary visual artist included in the Guinness Book of World Records as the youngest professional artist in the world
 BakuBoy & Austin Blake, DJ, producer duo
 Artemi Ayvazyan, composer and conductor
 Sheyla Jafarova, singer
 Seyran Caferli, drawer, cartoonist
 Anna Antonicheva, ballerina
 Bella Davidovich, pianist
 Larisa Dolina, Russian pop singer
 Alexey Ekimyan, composer and police general
 Gara Garayev, composer
 Cihangir Ghaffari, Iranian actor and producer 
 Garri Dadyan, painter, a National Master Artist of the Soviet Union
 Uzeyir Hajibeyov, composer
 Avet Terterian, composer
 Adilia Alieva, pianist
 Eldar Gasimov, singer
 Nigar Jamal, singer
 Samira Efendi, singer (daughter of Oil Business multi-millionaires)

Business
 Vagit Alekperov, founder of the leading Russian oil company LUKOIL
 Zeynalabdin Taghiyev, industrial magnate and philanthropist

Literature
 Magsud Ibrahimbeyov, writer
 Zecharia Sitchin, writer of The 12th Planet
 Edward Topol, novelist

Politics
 Khalilullah I, (1417-1465), ruler of Shirvan 
 Georgy Shakhnazarov, Soviet political scientist
 Andrey Lugovoy, Russian politician and businessman
 ilham Aliyev, politician

Science
 Max Black, philosopher
 Hovannes Adamian, engineer and designer of the systems of black and white and color television

Sport

Football
 Arkady Andreasyan, football player and manager
 Tofik Bakhramov, football, football referee; known for his role as the linesman who helped to award a goal for England in the 1966 World Cup Final
 Anatoliy Banishevskiy, football, football player (Azerbaijan/USSR)
 Eduard Markarov, football player and manager
 Yura Movsisyan, football player
 Gyabrlamish Mamedov, USSR soccer star

Chess
 Vladimir Akopian, Grandmaster and twice Olympic champion
 Vladimir Bagirov, Grandmaster and coach
 Vugar Gashimov, Grandmaster and European team champion
 Garry Kasparov, Grandmaster and World Champion
 Melikset Khachiyan, Grandmaster
 Elmar Magerramov, Grandmaster and coach
 Ashot Nadanian, International Master, theoretician and coach
 Teimour Radjabov, Grandmaster and European Team champion
 Emil Sutovsky, Grandmaster and World Junior Champion
 Tatiana Zatulovskaya, Grandmaster and World Senior Champion

Mixed martial arts

Wrestling 
Rami Miron (born 1957), Israeli Olympic wrestler

Other
 Gregory Eidinov — one of the organizers and leaders of the partisan movement in Belarus during the Great Patriotic War
 Gamar Almaszadeh — the first Azerbaijani ballerina, People's Artist of USSR (1959)
 Ivan Besedin — head of Moscow Metro (2011-)
 Kerim Kerimov — Azerbaijani-Soviet/Russian aerospace engineer and a renowned rocket scientist, one of the founders of the Soviet space industry, and for many years a central figure in the Soviet space program
 Leyla Vakilova — ballerina and ballet instructor, People's Artist of USSR (1967)
 Musa Manarov — cosmonaut, Hero of the Soviet Union
 Sergei Shumsky — Prosecutor of the Republic of Sakha (Yakutia), Russia (2005–2006)
 Sultan Mir Haidar Tuni — founder-eponym  of the Shiite haydariyya fraternity (or mirhaydari)
 Vera Tsignadze — ballerina, People's Artist of Georgian SSR (1955)
 Raphael Aghayev (WKF), multiple world karate champion
 Karina Aznavourian, épée fencer and twice Olympic champion
 Inna Ryskal, volleyball player and twice Olympic champion
 Dr.Konstantin Slavin, professor of neurosurgery and head of the Stereotactic and Functional Neurosurgery section at University of Illinois, Chicago, USA
 Svetlana Tatunts, researcher and university professor

Notes

Baku
People
 
Baku